Swanson Glacier is a glacier, 9 nautical miles (17 km) long, draining the east slopes of Daniels Range northward of Thompson Spur, in the Usarp Mountains. Mapped by United States Geological Survey (USGS) from surveys and U.S. Navy air photos, 1960–63. Named by Advisory Committee on Antarctic Names (US-ACAN) for Charles D. Swanson, United States Antarctic Research Program (USARP) biologist at McMurdo Station, 1967–68.

Glaciers of Pennell Coast